Sleepwalking is a sleep disorder.

Sleepwalking may also refer to:

Albums 
 Sleepwalking (Gerry Rafferty album) or the title song, 1982
 Sleepwalking (Magnum album) or the title song, 1992
 Sleepwalking (Memphis May Fire album) or the title song, 2009
 Sleepwalking (Rae & Christian album), 2001
 Sleepwalking (EP) or the title song, by Ammonia, 1995
Sleepwalking, by Jonathan Bree, 2018

Songs 
 "Sleepwalking" (Bring Me the Horizon song), 2013
 "Sleepwalking" (The Chain Gang of 1974 song), 2014
 "Sleepwalking" (Maria Lawson song), 2006
 "Sleepwalking", by the Automatic from This Is a Fix, 2008
 "Sleepwalking", by Lissie from Back to Forever, 2013
 "Sleepwalking (Couples Only Dance Prom Night)", by Modest Mouse from Interstate 8, 1996

Other uses 
 Sleepwalking (film), a 2008 American drama
 Atmel SleepWalking, a form of autonomous peripheral operation in Atmel/Microchip microcontrollers

See also 
 Sleepwalk (disambiguation)
 Sleepwalker (disambiguation)